Catterlen is a small village and civil parish  north west of Penrith, Cumbria. At the 2001 census the civil parish had a population of 471, increasing to 605 at the 2011 Census.

The village is a linear one with the B5305 road dividing it into two.  Junction 41 of the M6 motorway is at Catterlen.

The parish of Catterlen also includes the slightly more populous village of Newton Reigny which was a separate parish from 1866 to 1934, previous to 1866 both villages were part of a larger Newton Reigny Parish.

The large house and former pele tower known as Catterlen Hall is closer to Newton Reigny than Catterlen.

Within the parish is the Newton Rigg College part of the Yorkshire-based Askham Bryan College.

Etymology
The name Catterlen is Brittonic in origin. The first part of the name is the element cadeir, meaning "throne, chair" (see Chatterton and Chadderton in Lancashire, and Catterton in North Yorkshire). The second element in the name is lẹ:n, whose Welsh equivalent llwyn means "thicket (of small trees and bushes)".

See also

Listed buildings in Catterlen

References

External links
 Cumbria County History Trust: Catterlen (nb: provisional research only – see Talk page)

Villages in Cumbria
Civil parishes in Cumbria